Himaldroma is a genus of harvestmen in the family Sclerosomatidae from Nepal.

Species
 Himaldroma altus J. Martens, 1987
 Himaldroma pineti J. Martens, 1987

References

Harvestmen
Harvestman genera